McGraths Flat is an Australian research site containing fossils and other evidence of animals and plants that existed in Miocene Australia. Located in central New South Wales, specimens at the site are in an exceptional state of preservation, described in paleontology as a Konservat-Lagerstätten, deposited in unusual conditions that record microscopic details of soft tissues and delicate structures. Fossil evidence of animals with soft bodies, unlike the bones of mammals and reptiles, is rare in Australia, and discoveries at McGraths' Flat have revealed unknown species of invertebrates such as insects and spiders.

The site, named for its discoverer, occurs on private land near the town of Gulgong. The degree of preservation at this Lagerstätte has been compared to the quality of that found at Crato Formation, Lake Eckfeld, and Libros. Other fossil sites in Australia, such as Riversleigh, Bullock Creek and Alcoota, are rich in the skeletal remains of Miocene fauna, but none provide the diversity of organisms, their interactions, or exquisite detail found at this site. The finely layered fossiliferous strata is associated with permanent water, perhaps an oxbow lake, in a mesic rainforest, habitat that once dominated the continent.

At the time of deposition of the fossil strata, from 16 to 11 million years ago, the site was a slow moving or still water body, perhaps a billabong. Along with fish, the fossilised remains of insects include an abundance of pupae and adult stages of aquatic species. Evidence of an isolated ecosystem at a stable and permanently wet site is supported by preliminary examination of taxa that includes midges.

References

 
 https://australian.museum/blog/amri-news/discovery-of-new-Australian-fossil/

Lagerstätten
Paleontological sites of Australia